Cover Girl Killer is a 1959 black and white British thriller film directed by Terry Bishop and starring Harry H. Corbett, Felicity Young, Victor Brooks and Spencer Teakle. It was shot at Walton Studios outside London.

Plot
In London, a series of cover girls are murdered in the sequence they appear on the front cover of "Wow" magazine. Each is strangled and dressed in the same outfit which they appeared.

The viewer is given the insight that this is probably "Mr Spendoza"; a middle-aged man with very thick glasses, a toupee and wearing a raincoat.

The police try to track down the killer and have several suspects. Posing variously as an advertising executive and a film and TV producer, the crafty murderer (Harry H. Corbett) eludes capture whilst luring his victims to their deaths one by one. He is motivated by what he sees as the moral corruption of the girls.

Spendoza goes to the police giving his name as Fairchild and gives the police a false lead as to what he says is connects to one of his tenants, Mr Spurling. He gives a description close to Spendoza emphasising his need for glasses. Fairchild does not wear glasses.

The publisher of "Wow" goes to the police saying the models are refusing to pose for the cover due to the murders.

Meanwhile Spendoza (without glasses and under a third name) goes to a theatrical agent, and hires someone who looks like his alter ego Spendoza to further throw the police off track.

The police decide to lure Spendoza to a specific site by using a specific cover on "Wow"; the theatre and burlesque show appearing at the beginning of the film.

Cast
 Harry H. Corbett - Mr Spendoza / Mr Fairchild
 Felicity Young - June Rawson 
 Spencer Teakle - John Mason 
 Victor Brooks - Inspector Brunner 
 Bernadette Milnes - Gloria Starke 
 Christina Gregg - Joy Adams 
 Tony Doonan - Sergeant 
 John Barrard - Lennie Ross 
 Charles Lloyd-Pack - Captain Adams
 Alan Edwards - Hodgkins 
 Dermot Kelly - Pop 
 Denis Holmes - Actor 
 Julie Shearing - Rosie 
 Tony Thawnton - Doctor 
 Paddy Joyce - Stagehand 
 Claude Jones - Constable Jones 
 John Baker - Plainclothes Man

Production
The film was made at Walton Studios, Walton-on-Thames, Surrey, England, and on location in London. A collection of then-and-now location stills and corresponding contemporary photographs is hosted at reelstreets.com.

In popular culture
Frankie Goes to Hollywood used a line of dialogue from the film in their 1984 number one single Two Tribes; "sex and horror are the new gods".

DVD release
Cover Girl Killer was released on Region 2 DVD on 11 October 2010.

References

External links

1959 films
1950s crime thriller films
1950s serial killer films
British crime thriller films
Films about modeling
Films directed by Terry Bishop
Films set in London
1950s English-language films
1950s British films